Carter is a Canadian television crime comedy drama series created by Garry Campbell, which premiered on May 15, 2018, on CTV Drama Channel (formerly Bravo). The series stars Jerry O'Connell as Harley Carter, the Canadian star of a hit American television detective series who returns to his hometown to rethink his life after having a public meltdown on the red carpet at an awards show, but finds that his old friends and neighbors can no longer separate him from his television persona and keep asking him to investigate real cases.

The cast includes Sydney Tamiia Poitier as Carter's childhood friend and police officer Sam Shaw, Kristian Bruun as streetwise truck stop owner Dave Leigh, as well as Brenda Kamino. In Season 2, Lyriq Bent joined the cast as the interim police chief, Joyce Boyle, and Andy Berman took over as showrunner. Produced by Amaze Film and Entertainment, the series is shot in North Bay, Ontario, in 2017.

The show was commissioned by Sony Pictures Television (for AXN in Spain, Latin America, Brazil, Japan, Central Europe and Russia) and Bell Media, and is distributed outside of Canada by Sony.

In January 2019, the series was renewed for a second season by WGN America in the United States. The second season premiered in Canada on October 25, 2019, and premiered on WGN America on January 20, 2020.

Cast

Main 
 Jerry O'Connell as Harley Carter
 Sydney Tamiia Poitier as Detective Sam Shaw
 Kristian Bruun as Dave Leigh
 Brenda Kamino as Dot Yasuda
 Lyriq Bent as Joyce Boyle

Recurring 
 Denis Akiyama as Koji Yasuda (season 1)
 Varun Saranga as Junior Agent Vijay Gill
 Matt Baram as Evidence Tech Wes Holm
 Naomi Snieckus as Medical Examiner Delilah Halsey

Episodes

Season 1 (2018)

Season 2 (2019)

Broadcast 
The series is slated to air on AXN in Europe, Asia, Africa and the Americas, and on UKTV in the United Kingdom.

A few weeks after the season premiere on Bravo, Bell Media announced that the series will receive a second window run on terrestrial CTV stations in the summer.

In the United States, WGN America acquired the airing rights in June 2018. The series premiered on the network on August 7, 2018.

Reception 
Amy Glynn from Paste called the show "cheeky, sardonic, and emotionally forward, with strong relationships between characters who generally have a humorous angle and tend to be pretty well-developed".

The show received a negative review with Canadian television critic John Doyle of The Globe and Mail calling the show "inelegantly made tomfoolery". He poked fun at other media sources being hung up on the star of the show, Jerry O'Connell, instead of critiquing the quality of the show itself. In short, he said, "When it comes to Canadian TV, the term "exacting standards" doesn't apply".

Los Angeles Times reviewer Lorraine Ali remarked "The show's hour-long episodes are generally pretty entertaining, thanks to the charm and timing of O'Connell" concluding that the show "isn't a gag a minute, or super edgy or the TV comedy that will beat "Veep's" Emmy record. It is, however, an easy-to-watch satire with just the right balance of smart jokes for silly situations".

References

External links 
 

2018 Canadian television series debuts
2019 Canadian television series endings
2010s Canadian crime drama television series
Television shows filmed in North Bay, Ontario
CTV Drama Channel original programming
CTV Television Network original programming
Television series by Sony Pictures Television
2010s Canadian comedy-drama television series